Sylvia Callen Franklin, also known as Sylvia Lorraine Callen, and Sylvia Caldwell, was a young Chicago communist, recruited by Louis Budenz into the Communist Party USA's secret apparatus c. 1937.

Callen was assigned by Dr. Gregory Rabinowitz to go to New York City and infiltrate the Trotskyist Socialist Workers Party (SWP) using the pseudonym "Sylvia Caldwell". She became the secretary of James Cannon, who headed the SWP.  Callen later testified to a federal grand jury about her infiltration of the SWP  and about how she provided information from the SWP offices to Rabinowitz. Rabinowitz was later replaced by Jack Soble. She had been married for a time to Zalmond Franklin, who also served Soviet intelligence.  For a time, she was also known as Sylvia Lorraine Doxsee.

Callen is identified in Venona traffic under the cover name SATYR.  Venona messages reveal Callen giving copies to the KGB of SWP correspondence, intimate information on Leon Trotsky's widow, Natalia Sedova, and financial reports of Trotskyist groups.

When Budenz later defected, he named Callen as a Stalinist infiltrator but her SWP comrades  refused to believe him. In 1954, Callen, then known as Sylvia Doxsee and living in Chicago, was called before a grand jury. Invoking the Fifth Amendment, she refused to answer questions about her membership in the SWP, her relationship with the KGB, Louis Budenz, or anything else. She was called back to another grand jury in 1958. This time, she was more cooperative, confessing that she met regularly with Rabinowitz and Soble to pass on confidential Trotskyist material at an apartment rented by a woman named Lucy Booker. Callen was named as an unindicted co-conspirator when Robert Soblen was charged with espionage in 1960, but she never publicly testified.

Callen's grand jury testimony was first publicly released and her status as a GPU agent confirmed as part of the International Committee of the Fourth International's Security and the Fourth International investigation.

Venona
The Venona project was a United States counterintelligence program initiated during World War II by the United States Army's Signal Intelligence Service (later absorbed by the National Security Agency), which ran from February 1, 1943, until October 1, 1980. It was intended to decrypt messages transmitted by the intelligence agencies of the Soviet Union (e.g. the NKVD, the KGB, and the GRU). Syvia Callen is referenced in the following Venona project decryptions, indicating that she worked for Soviet NKVD:
 899 KGB New York to Moscow, 11 June 1943, p. 1
 899 KGB New York to Moscow, 11 June 1943, p. 2
 926 New York to Moscow, 16 June 1943
 670 KGB New York to Moscow, 11 May 1944, p. 1
 670 KGB New York to Moscow, 11 May 1944, p. 2
 670 KGB New York to Moscow, 11 May 1944, p. 3
 751–752 KGB New York to Moscow, 26 May 1944
 851 KGB New York to Moscow, 15 June 1944, p. 1
 851 KGB New York to Moscow, 15 June 1944, p. 2

References
 Louis Budenz affidavit, 11 November 1950, American Aspects of the Assassination of Leon Trotsky, U.S. Congress, House of Representatives, Committee on Un-American Activities, 81st Cong., 2d sess., part I, v–ix
 Louis Budenz, Men Without Faces: The Communist Conspiracy in the USA (New York: Harper and Brothers, 1948), 123–126.
 New York FBI memo, serial 1980, FBI Silvermaster file (FBI file 65-56402). On Straight, see chapter 5.
 Sylvia Franklin Dossier (New York: Labor Publication, 1977) contains excerpts from Callen's grand jury testimony.
 Callen's grand jury testimony is in The Gelfand Case: A Legal History of the Exposure of U.S. Government Agents in the Leadership of the Socialist Workers Party, vol. 2 (Detroit: Labor Publication, 1985), 526–564.
 FBI memorandum, Existing Corroboration of Bentley's Overall Testimony, FBI Silvermaster file, serial 4201; Margaret Browder FBI file, 100-287645, serial 153; Booker interview in Sylvia Franklin Dossier.
 John Earl Haynes and Harvey Klehr, Venona: Decoding Soviet Espionage in America (New Haven: Yale University Press, 1999), pgs. 261, 262–263, 276.

External links
FBI Silvermaster file

Members of the Communist Party USA
Members of the Socialist Workers Party (United States)
American people in the Venona papers
American spies for the Soviet Union
American communists
Possibly living people
Year of birth missing